Arnstein  is a 12th-century castle ruin, located above Maria Raisenmarkt in Austria. In 1529 Arnstein was destroyed by Turkish troops in the Siege of Vienna.

References

Ruined castles in Austria